Lucy Carmichael is a 1951 romantic drama novel by the British writer Margaret Kennedy. It was her tenth published novel. It was well-received by critics but did not repeat the success of her earlier hits The Constant Nymph and Escape Me Never. It was a Literary Guild choice in America. In 2011 it was reissued by Faber and Faber.

Her next novel Troy Chimneys was awarded the James Tait Black Memorial Prize for 1953.

Synopsis
After Lucy Carmichael is jilted at the altar she slowly rebuilds her life by taking a job at an educational institute in rural Lincolnshire.

References

Bibliography
 Hammill, Faye. Women, Celebrity, and Literary Culture Between the Wars. University of Texas Press, 2007.
 Hartley, Cathy. A Historical Dictionary of British Women. Routledge, 2013.
 Vinson, James. Twentieth-Century Romance and Gothic Writers. Macmillan, 1982.
 Stringer, Jenny & Sutherland, John. The Oxford Companion to Twentieth-century Literature in English. Oxford University Press, 1996.

1951 British novels
Novels by Margaret Kennedy
Novels set in Lincolnshire
British romance novels
Macmillan Publishers books